Bolgart is a townsite north of Toodyay in Western Australia. It is in the Shire of Victoria Plains.

The town derives its name from a nearby spring. The spring was discovered and the name recorded by explorer George Fletcher Moore in 1836. The area was settled in the 1840s and one of the first settlers, J Scully, named his property Bolgart. The townsite was gazetted in 1909.

The name of the town is Aboriginal in origin and means place of water.

The town was struck by a magnitude 5.2 earthquake on 11 March 1952 followed by several aftershocks. The earthquake was felt as far away as Perth, where taller buildings were rocked.

The reserves Drummond Nature Reserve and Bewmalling Nature Reserve are west and south west of this locality.
The main industry in town is wheat farming with the town being a Cooperative Bulk Handling receival site.

A railway line runs through Bolgart, which was the terminus of the Newcastle–Bolgart Railway before it was extended to Miling and became the Clackline–Miling railway.

The town also has a small agricultural museum housing a restored early twentieth century Marshall oil-fired tractor.

Gallery

References

See also 
 Earthquakes in Western Australia
 South West Seismic Zone

Towns in Western Australia
Grain receival points of Western Australia
Shire of Victoria Plains